The Ontario Moderate Party is a minor centrist political party in Ontario, Canada founded in 2014. The party's stated foci are improving manufacturing and industry in Ontario, reducing taxes, promoting healthy eating, decriminalizing marijuana, and promoting renewable energy.

OMP nominated two candidates in the 2014 provincial election; party leader Yuri Duboisky ran in the riding of Richmond Hill and Ian Lytvyn ran in the riding of Etobicoke—Lakeshore. Neither candidate gained a seat in the Legislative Assembly of Ontario and the party received approximately 0.01% of the popular vote. In the 2018 Provincial Election, the party ran 16 candidates. None won a seat and the party received approximately 0.04% of the vote. The party failed to win any seats in the 2022 Ontario general election.

Election results

Notes

External links
 

Provincial political parties in Ontario
Political parties established in 2014
2014 establishments in Ontario